Trans World Airlines (TWA) Flight 553 was a McDonnell Douglas DC-9-15 jet airliner, registration N1063T, operated by Trans World Airlines on March 9, 1967 between Pittsburgh, Pennsylvania and Dayton, Ohio. All 25 aboard the DC-9 and the sole occupant of the Beechcraft were killed.

Summary
Flight 553 departed from Greater Pittsburgh Airport en route to Dayton Municipal Airport. The flight was in uncontrolled airspace but under the control of Dayton radar approach, which advised the pilots of uncontrolled visual flight rules (VFR) traffic ahead and slightly to the right and one mile away, about 18 seconds before the collision. The crew acknowledged the traffic advisory. As the airliner descended through  at a speed of 323 knots on a southwest heading, its front right side collided with the left side of a southbound Beechcraft Baron 55. Both aircraft fell in Concord Township, a rural area northwest of Urbana in Champaign County. The collision occurred just northeast of the intersection of Melody Lane and Woodville Pike.

Cause
Visual flight rules (VFR) were in effect at the time of the accident, meaning that the pilots of both aircraft were responsible to "see and avoid" each other. In addition, the radar controller stated that he did not see the Beechcraft on his radar scope until 22 seconds before the crash. Controllers testified that the zone near the crash site was one in which small planes could be difficult to detect on radar, but flight checks in the area proved inconclusive.

The National Transportation Safety Board investigated the accident and determined that because of the DC-9's high rate of descent, its pilots were not able to see the other plane in time to avoid a collision.

Aftermath
Enacted in 1961 in the wake of the 1960 New York mid-air collision, FAR Part 91.85 mandated speed restrictions below  within 30 nautical miles of a destination airport. After the accident involving Flight 553, all areas below  were prohibited from exceeding  IAS. The accident also influenced the Federal Aviation Administration's decision to create terminal control areas or TCAs (now called Class B airspace) around the busiest airports in the country. The airspace around Dayton did not become a TCA, undergoing only minor changes until it was reclassified as Class C airspace in the late 1980s.

References

External links 
 
 Airliners.net Flight 553 preparing for departure in a photo by Bob Garrard, 1967
 National Transportation Safety Board Report AAR68 on the crash

1967 in Ohio
Airliner accidents and incidents in Ohio
Aviation accidents and incidents in the United States in 1967
Mid-air collisions
Mid-air collisions involving airliners
Mid-air collisions involving general aviation aircraft
553
Accidents and incidents involving the McDonnell Douglas DC-9
Champaign County, Ohio
March 1967 events in the United States